Camp Columbia State Park/State Forest is a public recreation area and state forest located in the town of Morris in Litchfield County, Connecticut. The  site was once the rural campus of Columbia University's Engineering Department. The majority of the property has been designated as a state forest; the acreage designated as a state historic park includes the frontage on Bantam Lake and the site of the former university buildings. It is managed by the Connecticut Department of Energy and Environmental Protection.

History
The area was primarily farmland until 1903 when it was purchased by Columbia University for use as a summer camp where engineering and surveying students could receive practical field experience. The camp remained in near continuous use for 80 years until closing down in 1983. During World War I, the property became the site of combat training for college students who sought officer commissions. Military exercises included simulated warfare with real gunfire and the digging of trenches. Remnants of the trenches dug during the training are still evident on the property. Counted among the dignitaries reported to have visited the campus is President Dwight D. Eisenhower, who is said to have hunted there while he was president of Columbia University. The state of Connecticut purchased the land from the university in 2000; it was dedicated as Camp Columbia State Forest and State Historic Park in 2004.

Activities and amenities
The park adjoins a finger of  Bantam Lake known as South Bay. The property is also used for bird watching; hunting is permitted in the state forest. Parking is available in a grassy lot beside Route 109.

Other than the remains of building foundations only two structures on the property are still standing: the "Class of 1906" observation tower (dedicated in 1942) and the "Instrument House".

Image gallery

References

External links
Camp Columbia State Park/State Forest Connecticut Department of Energy and Environmental Protection
Camp Columbia State Park Map Connecticut Department of Energy and Environmental Protection

State parks of Connecticut
Parks in Litchfield County, Connecticut
Columbia University campus
Morris, Connecticut
Litchfield, Connecticut
Connecticut state forests
Protected areas established in 2004
2004 establishments in Connecticut